Aadorp is a village on the northern side of Almelo, Netherlands with a population of about 1500; it has been part of the Almelo municipality since 2001. The villagers of Aadorp are very close, since there are so few of them. The central meeting point in Aadorp is the Aahoes, which consists of a meeting hall, and a small barbershop. Also, Aadorp has recreation areas including soccer fields and more. For anything else Aadorp villagers must go to one of the neighbouring towns.

History 
The village was first mentioned in 1867 as Aabrug, and means "settlement on the river Aa". The river Aa is nowadays part of the Twentekanaal. It formally exists since 3 November 1930 when the hamlets of Woesten and Buitenwonen were merged into the village of Aadorp. In the early 20th century, it was a peat excavation settlement. There was a railway station of the Mariënberg to Almelo railway line between 1920 and 1938. In 1925, a Dutch Reformed church was built in the village. It was replaced in 1992.

Geography 
Aadorp is situated around the small canal Almelo-De Haandrik, which connects it to Vriezenveen on the northern side and to Almelo on the southern side. A train track leads right next to this canal and also heads from Almelo to Vriezenveen. Aadorp's neighbours are:
Vriezenveen to the north side
Almelo on the southeast side
Wierden on the west side

Gallery

References 

Twente
Populated places in Overijssel
Almelo